The 1938 Amateur World Series was the inaugural Amateur World Series tournament (the Baseball World Cup as of the 1988 tournament). It was contested by Great Britain and the United States over a series of five games from August 13 to August 20 in England. It was won by Great Britain.

Participants

Venues

Results

Final standings

Rosters

References

Chetwynd, J. Baseball in Europe

Amateur World Series, 1938
Amateur World Series
Baseball World Cup
Baseball competitions in the United Kingdom
International baseball competitions in Europe
Amateur World Series
International sports competitions in Liverpool
1930s in Liverpool
Sports competitions in Leeds
Sport in Kingston upon Hull
Sport in the Metropolitan Borough of Rochdale
Sport in Halifax, West Yorkshire
1930s in Leeds
1930s in the East Riding of Yorkshire